Nathalie Lesdema (born 17 January 1973 in Fort-de-France, Martinique) is a French basketball player who played for the French women's national basketball team at the 2000 Summer Olympics.

References

1973 births
Living people
Basketball players at the 2000 Summer Olympics
French expatriate basketball people in Spain
French people of Martiniquais descent
French women's basketball players
Martiniquais women's basketball players
Olympic basketball players of France
People from Fort-de-France